Giura may refer to:

 Giura, a village in Bâcleș, Romania
 Alexandru Giura (born 1957), Romanian sprint canoer
 Luigi Giura, (1795–1865), Italian engineer and architect